The pound sign  is the symbol for the pound unit of sterling – the currency of the United Kingdom and previously of Great Britain and of the Kingdom of England. The same symbol is used for other currencies called pound, such as the Gibraltar, Egyptian, Manx and Syrian pounds. The sign may be drawn with one or two bars depending on personal preference, but the Bank of England has used the one-bar style exclusively on banknotes since 1975.

In Canada and the United States, "pound sign" refers to the symbol   (number sign).

Origin
The symbol derives from the upper case Latin letter , representing libra pondo, the basic unit of weight in the Roman Empire, which in turn is derived from the Latin word, libra, meaning scales or a balance. The pound became an English unit of weight and in England became defined as the tower pound (equivalent to 350 grams) of sterling silver. According to the Royal Mint Museum:

However, the simple letter L, in lower- or uppercase, was used to represent the pound in printed books and newspapers until well into the 19th century.

Usage
In the case of Sterling, the pound sign is placed before the numerals (e.g., £12,000) and separated from the following digits by no space or only a thin space. In the UK, the sign is used without any prefix though elsewhere the style GB£ may be seen; in Egypt and Lebanon, a disambiguating letter is added (E£ or £E and £L respectively). In international banking and foreign exchange operations, the symbol is rarely used: the ISO 4217 currency code (GBP, EGP, LBP etc.) is preferred. Traditionally, abbreviations such as  '£stg.' or '£ stg.' (e.g. "£stg.12,000" or "£12,000 stg.") have also been used for this purpose.

Other English variants 
(The # symbol is also known as "hash sign", "number sign", and "noughts and crosses board".)

In American English, the term "pound sign" usually refers to the symbol  (number sign), and the corresponding telephone key is called the "pound key". (As in Canada, the # symbol has many other uses.)

Historic variants

Double bar style 
Banknotes issued by the Bank of England since 1975 have only used the single bar style as a pound sign. The bank used both the two-bar style and the one-bar style (and sometimes a figure without any symbol whatever) more or less equally since 1725 until 1971, intermittently and sometimes concurrently.  In typography, the symbols are allographs style choices when used to represent the pound; consequently fonts use  (Unicode) code point irrespective of which style chosen, (not  despite its similarity). It is a font design choice on how to draw the symbol at U+00A3: although most computer fonts do so with one bar, the two-bar style is not rare (as may be seen in the illustration above).

Other

In the eighteenth-century Caslon metal fonts, the pound sign was identical to an italic uppercase J, rotated 180 degrees.

Currencies that use the pound sign 
 Egypt: Egyptian pound
 Falkland Islands: Falkland Islands pound
Gibraltar: Gibraltar pound
 Guernsey: Guernsey pound
 Isle of Man: Manx pound
 Jersey: Jersey pound
 St Helena: Saint Helena pound
 South Sudan: South Sudanese pound
 Sudan: Sudanese pound
 Syria: Syrian pound
 United Kingdom: Pound sterling

Former currencies 

 Australia: Australian pound
 The Bahamas: Bahamian pound
 Bermuda: Bermudian pound
 Canada: Canadian pound
 Cyprus: Cypriot pound
 Fiji: Fijian pound
 The Gambia: Gambian pound
 Ghana: Ghanaian pound
 Ireland: Irish pound
 Malta; Maltese pound
 New Zealand: New Zealand pound
 Rhodesia: Rhodesian pound
 South Africa: South African pound
 Tonga: Tongan pound
 Western Samoa: Western Samoan pound

Code points 
These have respective code points:

 
 

Unicode notes that the "lira sign" is not widely used and was added due to both it and the pound sign being available on HP printers.

The encoding of the £ symbol in position xA3 (16310) was first standardised by ISO Latin-1 (an "extended ASCII") in 1985. Position xA3 was used by the Digital Equipment Corporation VT220 terminal, Mac OS Roman, Amstrad CPC, Amiga, and Acorn Archimedes.

Many early computers (limited to a 7-bit, 128-position character set) used a variant of ASCII with one of the less-frequently used characters replaced by the £. The UK national variant of ISO 646 was standardised as BS 4730 in 1985. MS-DOS on the IBM PC  originally used a non-standard 8-bit character set Code page 437 in which the £ symbol was encoded as x9C; adoption of the ISO/IEC 8859-1 ("ISO Latin-1") standard code xA3 only came later with Microsoft Windows. The Atari ST also used position x9C. The HP LaserJet used position xBA for the £ symbol, while most other printers used x9C. The BBC Ceefax system which dated from 1976 encoded the £ as x23. The ZX Spectrum and the BBC Micro used x60  (grave). The Commodore 64 used x5C  while the Oric used x5F . IBM's EBCDIC  code page 037 uses xB1 for the £ while its code page 285 uses x5B. ICL's 1900-series mainframes used a six-bit (64-position character set) encoding for characters, loosely based on BS 4730, with the £ symbol represented as octal 23 (hex 13, dec 19).

Entry methods

Typewriters 
Typewriters produced for the British market included a "£" sign from the earliest days, though its position varied widely. A 1921 advertisement for an Imperial Typewriters model D, for example shows a machine with two modifier shifts (CAPS and FIG), with the "£" sign occupying the FIG shift position on the key for letter "B". But the advertisement notes that "We make special keyboards containing symbols, fractions, signs, etc., for the peculiar needs of Engineers, Builders, Architects, Chemists, Scientists, etc., or any staple trade."

On Latin-alphabet typewriters lacking a "£" symbol type element, a reasonable approximation could be made by overtyping an "f"  over an "L". Historically, "L" overtyped with a hyphen or an equals sign was also used. In the case of Sterling, the abbreviation "Stg." may be seen used in specialist contexts instead of the £ sign (as in ).

Compose key 
The compose key sequence is:

Windows, Linux, Unix 
On Microsoft Windows, Linux and Unix, the UK keyboard layout has the "£" symbol on the 3 number key and is typed using:
 

On a US-International keyboard in Windows, the "£" can be entered using:
 
  (on keyboards without an engraved AltGr key)

On a US-International keyboard in Linux and Unix, the "£" can be entered using:
  followed by  
 

In Windows, it may also be generated through the Alt keycodes, although the results vary depending on factors such as the locale, codepage and OS version:
 + (keeping Alt pressed until all 4 digits have been typed on the numeric keypad only)
 + (this also works in MS-DOS)

Windows also supports the combination   but this combination may be overridden by applications for other purposes.

The Character Map utility and Microsoft Word's Insert Symbol commands may also be used to enter this character.

Mac OS 
The symbol "£" is in the MacRoman character set and can be generated on most non-UK Mac OS keyboard layouts which do not have a dedicated key for it, typically through:
 
On UK Apple Mac keyboards, this is reversed, with the "£" symbol on the number 3 key, typed using:
  (and the number sign "#" generated by )

Android
Pressing and holding the local currency sign will invoke a pop-up box presenting an array of currency signs, from which the pound sign may be chosen.

Other uses 
The logo of the UK Independence Party, a British political party, is based on the pound sign, symbolising the party's opposition to adoption of the euro and to the European Union generally.

A symbol that appears to be a double-barred pound sign is used as the logo of the record label Parlophone. In fact this is a stylised version of a blackletter L, standing for Lindström (the firm's founder Carl Lindström).

The pound sign was used as an uppercase letter (the lowercase being ſ) signifying  in the early 1993–1995 version of the Turkmen Latin alphabet.

See also 
Latin letter L with stroke 
Semuncia 
:Category:Currency symbols

Notes

References 

Currency symbols